Yevgeny Yuryevich Lukyanenko (Evgenij Luk′ânenko; born 23 January 1985) is a Russian pole vaulter.

His personal best jump is 6.01 metres, achieved in July 2008 in Bydgoszcz.

International competitions

References

1985 births
Living people
People from Slavyansk-na-Kubani
Sportspeople from Krasnodar Krai
Russian male pole vaulters
Olympic male pole vaulters
Olympic athletes of Russia
Olympic silver medalists for Russia
Olympic silver medalists in athletics (track and field)
Athletes (track and field) at the 2008 Summer Olympics
Athletes (track and field) at the 2012 Summer Olympics
Medalists at the 2008 Summer Olympics
World Athletics Championships athletes for Russia
World Athletics Indoor Championships winners
Russian Athletics Championships winners